Theodoros Pakaltsis (born 9 May 1978) is a Greek former professional footballer who played as a centre-back.

Pakaltsis joined Veria F.C. in September 1994 and made 35 Alpha Ethniki appearances before the club was relegated after the 1998–99 season. He moved to Panionios F.C. in 2000, but did not make any league appearances for the club. He made 6 more appearances in the Alpha Ethniki with Kallithea F.C. during the 2003–04 season, but he has only played in the lower divisions since.

References

1978 births
Living people
Greek footballers
Veria F.C. players
Panionios F.C. players
Niki Volos F.C. players
Kallithea F.C. players
Kavala F.C. players
Olympiacos Volos F.C. players
Association football defenders
Footballers from Ptolemaida